Kunerad is a village and municipality in Žilina District in the Žilina Region of northern Slovakia.

History
In historical records the village was first mentioned in 1490.

Geography
The municipality lies at an altitude of 494 metres and covers an area of 22.937 km². It has a population of about 931 people.

References

External links
https://web.archive.org/web/20080111223415/http://www.statistics.sk/mosmis/eng/run.html

Villages and municipalities in Žilina District